Robert Axelrod (May 29, 1949 - September 7, 2019),  also credited as Axel Roberts and Myron Mensah, was an American actor. He was primarily known for his voice work, which included Digimon, having started voice acting for the English-language versions of anime in 1980; providing the voice of Lord Zedd, the main villain of the Mighty Morphin Power Rangers; and Finster, the original Mighty Morphin Power Rangers monster maker. He also portrayed a sympathetic doctor, Jennings, in The Blob. He also portrayed a Paul McCartney look-alike on the popular sitcom Family Matters, and later in his career appeared in several productions by comedy duo Tim & Eric.

Biography
He was born and raised in New York City. He has said that he wanted to be in the entertainment industry starting in kindergarten after first entertaining his classmates. He started acting in commercials and theater as a child. He then worked as a full-time guitarist in the early 1970s. Then in 1980 he got his start in voice over roles with Banner the Squirrel. He continued throughout the years performing on stage and in 1983 starred in the rock play All the Difference. In 1984 he started working for Saban Entertainment doing voice over and writing for programs including Wowser and Hallo Spencer, which he said were "the two finest products we produced." His agency, Mobile Monicker Productions, noted that he voiced over 150 characters in his career.

Death
Axelrod died in Los Angeles on September 7, 2019, at the age of 70. He had been suffering from complications from a spinal surgery he had in 2018. He was survived by his sister.

Filmography

Anime
 Aesop's Fables - Hare
 Around the World with Willy Fog - Additional Voices
 The Big O - Colonel Anthony Gauss - As Axel Roberts
 Carried by the Wind: Tsukikage Ran - Genma Otagaki
 Codename: Robotech - Rico
 Cowboy Bebop - Doctor Londes - As Axel Roberts
 Digimon Adventure - Wizardmon, Vademon
 Digimon Adventure 02 - Armadillomon, Ankylomon, Wizardmon, Shakkoumon (Shared with Dave Mallow)
 Dogtanian and the Three Muskehounds - Blue Falcon, Additional Voices
 Gaiking - Prince Darius, Additional voices 
 Ghost in the Shell: Stand Alone Complex - Katakura
 Grimm's Fairy Tale Classics - Hare
 Hajime no ippo - Hachinohe
 Honeybee Hutch - Additional Voices
 Little Women - Father
 Lensman - Sol
 Maple Town - Additional Voices
 Neo-Tokyo - Tsutomu Sugioka
 The Noozles - Additional Voices
 Robotech - Rico (as Axel Roberts)
 Rurouni Kenshin - Sakata, Additional Voices
 Samurai Champloo - Roukishi
 Space Pirate Captain Harlock - Dr. Zero 
 Transformers: Robots in Disguise - Movor
 Wowser - Ratso Catso 
 Ys - Jenokris

Animation
 Animated Stories from the New Testament - Bartholomew
 Chucklewood Critters - George, Easter Bunny
 Creepy Crawlers - Additional Voices
 Iznogoud - Additional Voices
 Jin Jin and the Panda Patrol - Professor Know-A-Lot, Additional Voices
 Journey to the Heart of the World - Scarface
 Little Miss - Narrator (USA version)
 Mickey Mouse Works - Headless Horseman
 Spider-Man: The Animated Series - Microchip
 Wisdom of the Gnomes - Additional Voices

Film

References

External links

2019 deaths
20th-century American male actors
21st-century American male actors
American male film actors
American male television actors
American male voice actors
Male actors from New York City